The Grand Duchy of Finland, also translated as Grand Principality of Finland, was the predecessor state of modern Finland. It existed between 1809 and 1917 as an autonomous part of the former Russian Empire.

Originating in the 16th century as a titular grand duchy held by the King of Sweden, the country became autonomous after its annexation by Russia in the Finnish War of 1808–1809. The Grand Duke of Finland was the Romanov Emperor of Russia, represented by the Governor-General. Due to the governmental structure of the Russian Empire and Finnish initiative, the Grand Duchy's autonomy expanded until the end of the 19th century. The Senate of Finland, founded in 1809, became the most important governmental organ and the precursor to the modern Government of Finland, the Supreme Court of Finland, and the Supreme Administrative Court of Finland.

Economic, social and political changes in the Grand Duchy of Finland closely paralleled those in the rest of the Russian Empire and in the rest of Europe. The economy grew slowly during the first half of the 19th century. The reign of Alexander II (1855–1881) saw significant cultural, social and intellectual progress, and an industrializing economy. Tensions increased after Saint Petersburg adopted Russification policies in 1898; the new circumstances saw the introduction of limited autonomy and the reduction of Finnish cultural expression. Unrest in Russia and Finland during the First World War (1914–1918) and the subsequent collapse of the Russian Empire in 1917 resulted in the Finnish Declaration of Independence and the end of the Grand Duchy.

History

An extended Southwest Finland was made a titular Grand Duchy in 1581, when King Johan III of Sweden, who as a Prince had been the Duke of Finland (1556–1561/63), extended the list of subsidiary titles of the Kings of Sweden considerably. The new title Grand Duke of Finland did not result in any Finnish autonomy, as Finland was an integrated part of the Kingdom of Sweden with full parliamentary representation for its counties. During the next two centuries, the title was used by some of Johan's successors on the throne, but not all. Usually, it was just a subsidiary title of the King, used only on very formal occasions. However, in 1802, as an indication of his resolve to keep Finland within Sweden in the face of increased Russian pressure, King Gustav IV Adolf gave the title to his new-born son, Prince Carl Gustaf, who died three years later.

During the Finnish War between Sweden and Russia, the four Estates of occupied Finland were assembled at the Diet of Porvoo on 29 March 1809 to pledge allegiance to Tsar Alexander I of Russia, who in return guaranteed that the area's laws and liberties, as well as religion, would be left unchanged. Following the Swedish defeat in the war and the signing of the Treaty of Fredrikshamn on 17 September 1809, Finland became a true autonomous Grand Duchy within the autocratic Russian Empire; but the usual balance of power between monarch and diet resting on taxation was not in place, since the Emperor could rely on the rest of his vast Empire. The title "Grand Duke of Finland" was added to the long list of titles of the Russian Tsar.

After his return to Finland in 1812, the Finnish-born Gustaf Mauritz Armfelt became counsellor to the Russian Emperor. Armfelt was instrumental in securing the Grand Duchy as an entity with relatively greater autonomy within the Russian realm, and acquiring so-called Old Finland that Russia had annexed from Sweden in the Treaty of Nystad (1721) and the Treaty of Åbo (1743).

Beginning of the Grand Duchy

The formation of the Grand Duchy stems from the Treaty of Tilsit between Tsar Alexander I of Russia and Emperor Napoléon I of the French.  The treaty mediated peace between Russia and France and allied the two countries against Napoléon's remaining threats: the United Kingdom and Sweden. Russia invaded Finland in February 1808, claimed as an effort to impose military sanctions against Sweden, but not a war of conquest, and that Russia decided to only temporarily control Finland. Collectively, the Finns were predominately anti-Russian, and Finnish guerillas and peasant uprisings were a large obstacles for the Russians, forcing Russia to use various tactics to quash armed Finnish rebellion. Thus, in the beginning of the war, General roda Voysk Friedrich Wilhelm Graf von Buxhoeveden, with permission of the Tsar, issued an oath of fealty on Finland, in which Russia would honour Finland's Lutheran faith, the Finnish Diet, and the Finnish estates as long as the Finns would remain loyal to the Russian Imperial Crown. The oath also dubbed anyone person who gave aid to the Swedish or Finnish armies a rebel.

The Finns complied, bitter over Sweden abandoning the country for their war against Denmark and France, and begrudgingly embraced Russian conquest. The Diet of Finland was now to only meet whenever requested, and was never mentioned in the manifesto published by the Ministry of Foreign Affairs.  Further on, Alexander I requested a deputation of the four Finnish estates, as he expressed concern over continued Finnish resistance. The deputation refused to act without the Diet, to which Alexander agreed with, and promised the Diet would shortly be summoned.  By 1809, all of Finland had been conquered and The Diet was summoned in March. Finland was then united through Russia via crown, and Finland was able to keep the majority of its own laws, giving it autonomy.

Instead of the newly acquired territory being subjected to direct rule by an Imperial Governor-General, a novel administrative system was established in Finland, drafted in part by the liberal Mikhail Speransky. The new Grand Duchy would be governed by a Government Council, later the Senate of Finland, a body made up of Finnish citizens. The Governor-General would accordingly have a relatively diminished role. Further, the Emperor would deal with matters relating to Finland directly through a dedicated Secretary of State, without the involvement of his Russian cabinet or administration. This laid the foundation for the considerable autonomy enjoyed by Finland for most of the period of Russian rule.

Early years 
The earlier years of the Grand Duchy can be seen as uneventful. In 1812, the area of Old Finland (known as Viipuri Province from 1812 to 1945) was gifted to Finland. Russia had annexed this territory from Sweden in the Great Northern War and the Russo-Swedish War (1741–1743). This surprising action by the Tsar was met with anger from certain parts of the Russian government and aristocracy, who wished to either return to the previous border or annex the communities west of St. Petersburg. Despite the outcry, the borders remained set until 1940. The gesture can be seen as Alexander's concern for Finland and his attempts of appeasement of the Finns, in attempts to gain their loyalty which would come from passive appeasement, compared to the vigorous Russification later in the nineteenth-century. Moreover, Alexander moved the capital from Turku to Helsinki, a small fortified town protected by Suomenlinna. Finland's main university also transferred to Helsinki after a fire broke out in Turku, destroying most of the building.

Despite promises of a Finnish Diet, the Diet was not called to meet until 1863 and many new laws going through the legislature were laws that would have required the approval of the Diet while under Swedish rule. Alexander went a step further to demand a Finnish House of Nobles, which organised in 1818.  The house was designed to register all noble families in Finland so that the highest Finnish estate would be representative of the next Finnish Diet. As for Sweden, the majority did not think too much about Finland's conquest, as Sweden itself annexed Norway from Denmark in 1814 and entered a personal union with the nation. Whether or not Alexander purposely ignored the existence of the Diet is debatable, with notable factors such as the fall of Napoléon and the creation of the Holy Alliance, newfound religious mysticism of the Russian crown, and the negative experience with the Polish Sejm. Despite this, Alexander I ceased to give in to Finnish affairs and returned to governing Russia.

Alexander's death and the assimilation of Finland: 1820s–1850s 

 

In 1823, Count Arseny Zakrevsky was made Governor-General of Finland and quickly became unpopular among both Finns and Swedes alike. Zakrevsky abolished the Committee for Finnish Affairs and managed to obtain the right to submit Finnish affairs to the Russian Emperor, bypassing the Finnish Secretary of State. Two years later, Alexander I died. Zakrevsky seized the opportunity to require Finland to swear an oath of fealty which would refer to the Emperor as the absolute ruler of Finland – expecting that Emperor would be Constantine, Alexander's next-eldest brother. However, Nicholas, younger brother of Constantine and Alexander, became Emperor despite the Decembrist revolt against him in December 1825. Nicholas assured Finland's secretary of state, Robert Henrik Rehbinder, that he (Nicholas) would continue to uphold Alexander's liberal policies regarding Finland.

In 1830 Europe became a hotbed of revolution and reform as a result of the July Revolution in France. Poland, another Russian client state, saw a massive uprising against Saint Petersburg during the November Uprising of 1830–1831.  Finland made no such move, as Russia had already won over Finnish loyalty. Thus, Russia continued its policies respecting Finnish autonomy and the quiet assimilation of the Finns into the empire. Zakrevsky died in 1831; Knyaz Alexander Sergeyevich Menshikov succeeded him as Governor-General of Finland and continued Finnish appeasement.  The appeasement of the Finns could be seen as a prototype of the later Russification, as educated Finns moved to Russia in mass, seeking jobs within the Imperial Court to rise within Russian imperial society. The Russian language was studied excitedly as well, with more Finns seeking to learn Russian language, politics, culture, and to assimilate into Russian society.  Even though Nicholas had no intentions on doing this, his inner office, specifically Nicholas's Interior Minister, Lev Perovski (in office: 1841–1852), advocated for Count Zakrevsky's ideas and further pushed the ideas of subtle Russification during the 1840s.

However, Finland did experience a nationalistic revolution in the 1830s - one based around literature. This marked the beginning of the Fennoman movement, a nationalistic movement that would operate in Finland until its independence. In 1831, the Finnish Literary Society was founded, which formed on the basis of appreciation of the Finnish language. Finnish was not represented as language of the scholarly elite, as most printed academic works, novels, and poetry was written in either Swedish or Russian. Copying the German reading rage, Lesewut, and subsequent Swedish mania, Finland entered the reading craze by the 1830s.  This fad peaked in 1835 with the publication of The Kalevala, the Finnish epic. The Kalevala'''s influence on Finland was massive, and strengthened Finnish nationalism and unity, despite the epic being poetry or stories about Finnish folklore. The quest for literature expanded into the 1840s and 1850s and caught the eye of the Finnish church and the Russian crown. Finnish newspapers, such as Maamiehen Ystävä (The Farmer's Friend), began publication in both urban and rural areas of Finland. However, the Swedish academic elite, the church, and the Russian government opposed Finland's literature movement. Edvard Bergenheim, Archbishop of Turku from 1850 to 1884, called for double censorship on works opposing the church and works appearing socialist or communist. The reactionary policies of the Lutheran Church convinced the also reactionary Nicholas I to prohibit (1850) the publishing of all Finnish works that were not religious or economic in nature, as such works would have been considered revolutionary and might encourage the Finnish majority to revolt against the church and crown. However, the censorship only fueled Finland's language strife and the Fennomanian movement.

Crimean War and 1860s–1870s 

The works of Johan Snellman and other Fennoman authors combined literature and nationalism and increased the calls for language recognition and education reforms in Finland. This heightened during the Crimean War in which Finnish ports and fortresses on the Baltic Sea became subject for Allied attacks, specifically Suomenlinna and Bomarsund in Åland during the Åland War. As newspapers were printed in Swedish and Russian due to the censorship, many Finns could not read about the events of the Battle of Bomarsund and the Battle of Suomenlinna. Moreover, Nicholas I died in 1855, and the new emperor, Alexander II, had already planned educational reforms in outlying territories in Russia, including Finland. Alexander II also planned to call on the Diet of the Estates once more. Under Alexander's rule, Finland experiences a period of liberalization in education, the arts, and economic desires. In 1858, Finnish was made the official language of local self-government, such as provinces, where Finnish was the majority of the language spoken. However, the Finns feared that St. Petersburg would prevent the Diet from meeting on the basis that Polish and Russian citizens did not receive the same liberties and that the Diet would be eradicated. It was misinterpreted, as it only added a few extra steps to how the lawmaking process worked; the Diet was allowed to stay.

In 1863, Alexander called the Diet and issued that the Finnish language was to be on par with Swedish and Russian in the Grand Duchy, while also passing laws regarding infrastructure and currency. Alexander came to favor the Finnish working class over the Swedish elite, due to Swedish propaganda during the Crimean War urging revolt against the Russians. Alexander also passed a law regarding language ordinance in August 1863, requiring that the Finnish language must be introduced to all public businesses within twenty years. The law was expanded in 1865 to require that state offices must serve the public in Finnish if requested. Despite this, the language laws took time to be fully implemented due to the interference of the Swedish elite, who owned most of these offices and businesses. Despite this, the education laws pushed through and the first secondary schools instructed in Finnish began in the 1870s.   The power of the Diet was also expanded in 1869, as it allowed the Diet more power and the ability to initiate various legislation; the act also called the Tsar to call upon the Diet every five years.  An act passed regarding religion was also passed in 1869 which prevented the power of the State over the church. Moreover, Finland also received its own monetary system, the Finnish markka, and its own army. Finland's first railway line was opened between Helsinki and Hämeenlinna on March 17, 1862.

 Russification 

The policies of Russification under Alexander III and Nicholas II easily sum up the time period from 1881 to 1917. In 1881, Alexander III took the throne after the death of his father and began a rule of staunch conservative, yet peaceful, rule of Russia. Finland, as well as many other outlying Russian territories, faced the burden of Russification, the cultural, social, economical, and political absorption into Russia. Compared to the early Russification of the 1830s and 1840s, the Russification of the late 19th-early 20th century was much more vigorous in its policies. Moreover, Finland faced political turmoil within its nation between various factions such as liberals, Social Democrats, Young Finns, and communists. Finland became a target for the Pan-Slavist movement, which called for Slavic unity in eastern Europe. Finland was viewed as conquered territory, and that as subjects, Finland was to respect the Tsar. Finland was also viewed as a land of settlement and that the "alien race" of the Finns were to be assimilated and protected from Western interference, thereby "blessing" the Finns with their presence. Moreover, Finnish representatives to the Tsar were replaced with Pan-Slavist advocates.

Russification only increased from there, but from the 1880s on, the conflict between the Swedish minority halted. Compared to the Baltic States, the Finnish majority was far better educated and more keen in Russian politics. The reactionary policies of Russification, which aimed to combine secular nationalism and a divine right monarchy, infiltrated the Finnish economy in 1885. Finland had managed to create a thriving modern industry based around textiles and timber that managed to rival the Russian economy at the time. Russian bureaucrats, out of both shock and jealousy, called for the revision of the Russo-Finnish Tariff. Russification had taken an economic turn as well, as the basis of the reformed tariff was economic uniformity, which only furthered economic difficulties of Finland. The tariff's revision in 1885, and subsequently 1897, was formed out of spite of Finland's commercial success and working-class unity. Russification policies continued into 1890, with the addition of the Imperial Post System in Finland, replacing the Finnish post. It was not until the mid-1890s, that the Finnish people realized the true intentions of the Russian crown.

Nicholas II ascended to the throne in 1894 after Alexander's death, and with him came General Nikolay Bobrikov, who was appointed governor-general.  Under Bobrikov, the Finns had a near collective hatred of him, whose reactionary policies gave rise to socialism and communism among the Finnish working class. The Party of Active Resistance and Kagal, in particular, became very popular in Finland for the former's tactics of violence and the latter's tactic of propaganda and persuasion. At the beginning of this reign, Bobrikov almost immediately introduced a mandatory five-year military service, in which Finns had the possibility of being drafted into Russian units. Furthermore, he instituted that Russians be given the opportunity to serve in public office and that Russian be made the administrative language of Finland. In 1899, the February Manifesto under Nicholas II declared that Russian law was the law of the land, and Finland was to pledge allegiance to Russian law. The Diet was essentially downgraded to a state assembly and that Finland was a province of Russia, ignoring its autonomy. The Finnish Army as a whole was dissolved in 1901.

Bobrikov unintentionally united both Finns and Swedes against Russia, which only angered him more. With churches refusing to proclaim the law, judges refusing to carry it out, and conscripts refusing service, Bobrikov went on a frenzy with the current state of Finland. Bobrikov found little support in Finland, mainly from the Russian minority and members of the Old Finnish Party, an extreme right-wing party that found little success. Bobrikov brought in Russian officials to take government and state spots and, in an extreme act of anger, suspended the Finnish Constitution in 1903. His actions were met with extreme anger from Finns and Swedes, in which the moderate parties, the Young Finns and the Swedish Party combined to collectively fight Bobrikov. The Social Democratic Party of Finland, a Marxist party popular among peasants was also extremely hostile and advocated class warfare and took arms, in contrast to the Social Democrats elsewhere in Europe. Finally, the Party of Active Resistance, a nationalist party that advocated an armed struggle and guerilla tactics, received fame when member Eugen Schauman assassinated Bobrikov in Helsinki on 16 June 1904.

In 1905, Russia faced a humiliating defeat in the Russo-Japanese War and amidst the turmoil in St. Petersburg, Finns remade their constitution and formed a new Diet whose representation was based on universal suffrage, giving women full suffrage before any other European nation after the short-lived Republic of Corsica. However, the Diet was quickly destroyed by Pyotr Stolypin, Nicholas II's prime minister. Stolypin proved to be even more vigorous than Bobrikov, as he believed every subject should be a stoic patriot to the crown and uphold undying loyalty to Russia. Stolypin wished to destroy Finland's autonomy and disregarded native tongues and cultures of non-Russian subjects, believing them to be traditional and ritualistic at best. The Finnish Diet once again formed to combat Stolypin, but Stolypin was bent on quashing Finnish insurrection and permanently disbanded the Diet in 1909. As with Bobrikov before him, Stolypin was unaware that such actions only fanned the flames and was subsequently assassinated by Dmitry Bogrov, a Jewish member of the far-left. From Stolypin's death henceforward, the Russian crown ruled Finland as a monarchist dictatorship until Russia's collapse during the Russian Revolution, from which Finland declared independence, a war of independence that soon transformed into a civil war.

 Government and politics 

200px|thumb|right|Provinces of the Grand Duchy of FinlandThe Russian emperor ruled as the Grand Duke of Finland and was represented in Finland by the Governor-General. The Senate of Finland was the highest governing body of the Grand Duchy and was composed of native Finns. In St. Petersburg Finnish matters were represented by the Minister–Secretary of State for Finland. The Senate had a primarily advisory role until it got the right to representation in 1886. On top of having its own central, regional and local administration, Finland had its own stamps, currency and army. 

Alexander I did not want the Grand Duchy to be a constitutional monarchy but the governmental institutions born during the Swedish rule offered him a more efficient form of government than the absolute monarchy in Russia. This evolved into a high level of autonomy by the end of the 19th century. 
There were a total of twenty Governors-General from the Finnish War until independence:

General Count Göran Magnus Sprengtporten 1808–1809
General Knyaz Michael Andreas Barclay de Tolly 1809–1810
General Count Fabian Steinheil 1810–1823
Count Gustav Mauritz Armfelt 1812–1813
General Count Arseny Zakrevsky 1823–1831
Admiral Aleksander Mensikov 1831–1855
General Friedrich Wilhelm Rembert Graf von Berg 1855–1861
General Baron Platon Rokassovsky 1854–1855, 1861–1866
General Johan Mauritz Nordenstam 1861, 1864, 1868, 1870, 1872–1873
General Count Nikolai Adlerberg 1866–1881
General Count Fyodor Logginovich van Heiden 1881–1897
General-Lieutenant Stepan Goncharov 1897–1898
General Nikolai Bobrikov 1898–1904
General-Lieutenant Knyaz Ivan Obolenski 1904–1905
Privy Councillor Nikolai Gerard 1905–1908
General Vladimir von Boeckmann 1908–1909
General-Lieutenant Franz Albert Seyn 1909–1917
Privy Councilor Adam Lipski 1917
Mikhail Stakhovich 1917
Nikolai Nekrasov 1917

 Provinces 

The administrative division of the Grand Duchy followed the Russian imperial model with provinces ( governorate) headed by governors. Few changes were made however, and as the language of the administrators was still Swedish the old terminology from the Swedish time continued in local use. The Viipuri Province was not initially part of the Grand Duchy, but in 1812 it was transferred by Tsar Alexander I from Russia proper to Finland. After 1831 there were eight provinces in the Grand Duchy until the end and that continued in the independent Finland:

 Turku and Pori Province
 Kuopio Province
 Vaasa Province
 Uusimaa Province
 Mikkeli Province
 Häme Province
 Oulu Province
 Viipuri Province

 Flags 

The Grand Duchy of Finland had no official flag, but different types of flags were used in different occasions. An official flag was debated even in the Diet of Finland in the 1860s, but one was never officially chosen.

An official maritime flag was chosen in 1812 for governmental use. It was a white flag, with the Russian flag in the upper corner and a compass rose in the middle. In 1883 it was replaced with a blue cross flag with the compass rose in the upper corner. A post flag (a white flag with the Russian flag in the upper corner and a post horn in the middle) was also used in the Grand Duchy, along with a customs flag (a blue flag, with the Russian flag on the upper corner and the logo of the customs agency in the middle).

Originally, there were no regulations regarding merchant flags until 3 October 1821, when Finnish ships were given the right to fly the Russian flag without permission. White, blue and red flags with the Russian flag in the corner were also used. Later on six and nine-striped flags with the colors of the Russian flag twice or thrice saw some use.

A blue cross flag similar to that of the modern flag of Finland was first used by the yacht club Nyländska Jaktklubben in 1861, equipped with the coat of arms of Uusimaa in the upper corner. It was inspired by the similar flag used by the Neva Yacht Club. The flag of the yacht club was made official by the Senate in 1890 when the Swedish-speaking Östra Nylands Segelförening adopted the Flag of Sweden.

At the end of the 19th century, flags with the coat of arms were used in unofficial contexts such as private estates and protests. In official contexts, the Russian white-blue-red tricolour was primarily used.

The Grand Duchy of Finland participated in the 1912 Summer Olympics with their own team. In the opening ceremony, the Finnish team marched behind the Russian team with a Finland-sign. In the medal ceremonies, the Russian flag above a white-blue pennant reading "Finland" was raised for the Finnish athletes.

 Historical population of the Grand Duchy 

 1810:  863,000
 1830: 1,372,000
 1850: 1,637,000
 1870: 1,769,000
 1890: 2,380,000
 1910: 2,943,000
 1920: 3,148,000 (independent Finland, since 1917)

 See also 
 Independence of Finland
 Military of the Grand Duchy of Finland
 Finnish Socialist Workers' Republic
 Old Finland
 Congress Poland – Kingdom of Poland (1815–1831), another constitutional monarchy within the Russian Empire
 Åland War
 Governorate of Estonia
 Grand Duchy of Lithuania
 Finnish Civil War

Notes

References

Bibliography
 .
 .
 .
 .

Further reading
 Alenius, Kari. "Russification in Estonia and Finland  Before 1917," Faravid, 2004, Vol. 28, pp. 181–94 Online
 Huxley, Steven. Constitutionalist insurgency in Finland: Finnish "passive resistance" against Russification as a case of nonmilitary struggle in the European resistance tradition (1990)
Jussila, Osmo, et al. From Grand Duchy to a Modern State: A Political History of Finland Since 1809 (Hurst & Co. 1999).
 Kan, Aleksander. "Storfurstendömet Finland 1809–1917 – dess autonomi enligt den nutida finska historieskrivningen" (in Swedish) ["Autonomous Finland 1809–1917 in contemporary Finnish historiography"] Historisk Tidskrift, 2008, Issue 1, pp. 3–27
 Polvinen, Tuomo. Imperial Borderland: Bobrikov and the Attempted Russification of Finland, 1898–1904 (1995) Duke University Press. 342 pp.
 Thaden, Edward C. Russification in the Baltic Provinces and Finland'' (1981). JSTOR

External links

 Grand Duchy of Finland at Flags of the World
 The text of The Imperial Manifesto of 1811 in German and Finnish
 

 
Former countries in Europe
Former grand duchies
Former monarchies of Europe
Governorates-General of the Russian Empire
States and territories established in 1809
States and territories disestablished in 1917
Russian-speaking countries and territories
Swedish-speaking countries and territories
1809 establishments in Europe
1917 disestablishments in Europe